The Hole (literally "The Trap") is a 1997 South Korean film directed by Kim Sung-hong.

Plot 
Jin-sook has a close relationship with her son, Don-woo, and is surprised when he announces his engagement to Su-jin. After the wedding, the three end up living together, with a nervous Su-jin keen to impress her new mother-in-law. But Jin-sook is determined to sabotage her son's marriage.

Cast 
 Yoon So-jeong ... Jin-sook
 Choi Ji-woo ... Su-jin
 Park Yong-woo ... Dong-woo
 Mun Su-jin
 Lee Seung-woo
 Jeon Hong-ryeol
 Koo Hye-ryung
 Youn Sung-hun
 Tae Yu-rim
 Kim Gye-pae
 Seo Eun-sun
 Kim Tae-beom
 Gang Gyeong-ja
 Lee Seok-hwan
 O Hyo-seok

Release 
The Hole was released in South Korea on 1 November 1997 and received a total of 141,717 admissions in Seoul, making it the tenth biggest selling Korean film of that year.

Critical response 
David Cornelius of DVD Talk found the film somewhat limited in scope, saying, "The limitations placed upon the story prevent any broadening of ideas, leaving us only with a clichéd chunk of domestic thriller that plays out by the numbers". However, he also acknowledged that such limitations also helped the film in other areas, saying, "The Hole becomes very claustrophobic, with a tension that never lets up for the last forty-some minutes. It's grandiose and outrageous, yes, but it's also highly effective in building the right kind of scares".

References

External links 
 
 

1997 films
Incest in film
1990s Korean-language films
1997 thriller films
South Korean thriller films